Khanaqin District is a district in Diyala Governorate, Iraq. The district is a part of the Disputed territories of Northern Iraq.

The Alwand River runs through Khanaqin District before joining the Diyala River.

The district population was estimated to be 175,000 in 2003. The population of the Judicial Center increased from 20,000 in 2003 to more than 160,000 in 2011.

References

External links
 Khanaqin, once known as ‘city of tolerance,’ still open to Arab refugees
 Wikimapia Xaneqîn District (KRG)
 Home - NGO Coordination Committee for Iraq - Diyala Governorate Profile Jan 2016

Districts of Diyala Province
Khanaqin